Sharqi Rural District is in the Central District of Ardabil County, Ardabil province, Iran. At the census of 2006, its population was 17,420 in 4,144 households; there were 8,729 inhabitants in 2,411 households at the following census of 2011; and in the most recent census of 2016, it had decreased to 7,962 in 2,362 households. The largest of its 10 villages was Aq Bolagh-e Rostam Khani, with 1,929 people.

References 

Ardabil County

Rural Districts of Ardabil Province

Populated places in Ardabil Province

Populated places in Ardabil County